Blumenkamp is a railway station in Blumenkamp, North Rhine-Westphalia, Germany.

The Station

The station is located on the Bocholt-Wesel railway and is served by RB services operated by Abellio Rail NRW.

Train services
The following services currently call at Blumenkamp:

References

DB Website 
Verkehrsgemeinschaft Niederrhein 
NIAG Website 

Railway stations in North Rhine-Westphalia